Sultan Azlan Muhibbuddin Shah ibni Almarhum Sultan Yussuff Izzuddin Shah Ghafarullahu-lah (19 April 1928 – 28 May 2014) was the 34th Sultan of Perak and served as the ninth Yang di-Pertuan Agong of Malaysia from 26 April 1989 to 25 April 1994. The child of a royal father and commoner mother, he grew up in Perak, Malaysia. During school he played field hockey, subsequently playing for the Perak team. He trained to be a lawyer in the United Kingdom. Upon returning to Malaysia, he soon became a judge and quickly rose through the legal ranks. In 1965, he became the youngest person appointed to the High Court of Malaya, and in 1982 he became the youngest ever Lord President of the Federal Court, the country's highest judicial rank.

He succeeded as the Sultan of Perak after Sultan Idris Shah II, his first cousin once removed, died in 1984. Subsequently, he was elected to be the Yang di-Pertuan Agong of Malaysia in 1989, serving a five-year term before returning to his post as Sultan of Perak. In 2009, he exercised his royal authority to prevent the dissolution of the Perak State Legislative Assembly, sparking a constitutional crisis.  Ultimately, the legal system ruled Sultan Azlan had acted properly.

During his career, Sultan Azlan Shah was awarded more than 3 dozen Malaysian and foreign honours. Dozens of buildings and other projects were named after him, including a genus of insects.  He was known as the "Father of Malaysian Hockey" for furthering field hockey at home and abroad, and was the patron of dozens of organisations.  With his wife Tuanku Bainun Binti Mohd Ali, Sultan Azlan had five children.

Early life and education
He was born on 19 April 1928 at Kampung Manggis, Batu Gajah, Perak. The youngest son of Sultan Yussuff Izzuddin Shah ibni Almarhum Sultan Abdul Jalil Karamatullah Nasiruddin Mukhtaram Shah Radziallah Hu'an-hu (reigned 1948–1963) by his second wife, Toh Puan Besar Hatijah binti Toh Indera Wangsa Ahmad (1906–1992), he was brought up by his mother outside of royal circles.

Raja Azlan Shah began his education at the Government English School, Batu Gajah Sekolah Menengah Kebangsaan Sultan Yussuf. For his secondary education, he attended Malay College Kuala Kangsar. Afterwards, he went to the University of Nottingham to study law, earning a Bachelor of Law degree in 1953. While in school, Azlan Shah began his lifelong love for field hockey, playing for his school teams. He subsequently played for the Perak team.

Legal career
Raja Azlan Shah was admitted to the English Bar on 23 November 1954. He returned to Malaysia, becoming the Assistant State Secretary of Perak. He joined the Judicial and Legal Service of the Federation of Malaya and soon became the President of the Sessions Court. He continued to rise quickly through the legal ranks, serving as Federal Counsel and Deputy Public Prosecutor, Legal Adviser of the State of Pahang, Registrar of the High Court of Malaya, and Chief Registrar of the Federal Court of Malaysia.

In 1965, Raja Azlan Shah, aged 37, became the youngest judge ever appointed to the High Court of Malaya. He was appointed to the Federal Court in 1973. In 1979, he was appointed Chief Justice of the High Court of Malaya. Finally, on 12 November 1982 he became the youngest ever Lord President of the Federal Court, the highest judicial post in Malaysia.

Becoming Sultan
His path to become the Sultan of Perak started when his father appointed him as Raja Kechil Bongsu on 19 August 1962, which makes him 6th and last in line to the throne. Due to the death of his father in the following year, he moved up a rank to become the Raja Kechil Tengah. On 1 January 1978, he moved up to Raja Kechil Sulong and later that year, on 1 August, he moved up to Raja Kechil Besar. 

Raja Azlan Shah was installed Raja Muda (Crown Prince) of Perak by the then-Sultan of Perak, Sultan Idris Almutawakkil Alallahi Shah II on 1 July 1983. During the long reign of Idris Shah, most of Raja Azlan Shah's elder brothers had died. His only surviving elder brother, Raja Baharom Shah, refused the office of Crown Prince and Raja Azlan Shah was suddenly heir to the throne.

Within six months, Sultan Idris died and Azlan Shah succeeded to the throne of Perak on 3 February 1984. He was officially installed as the 34th Sultan of Perak on 9 December 1985. In 1989, Sultan Azlan Shah was elected as the ninth Yang di-Pertuan Agong of Malaysia, as the Ruler of Perak was the last of the nine Malay Rulers of Malaysia who has not served as the Yang di-Pertuan Agong for its first cycle. After the five-year term ended, he returned to his post as Sultan of Perak in 1994.

Sultan Azlan Shah reigned for a total of 30 years and 114 days, the longest reign for a Sultan of Perak post-independence day, and the second longest reign in the history of the Sultanate, only behind the 11th Sultan, Sultan Mahmud Iskandar Shah.

Perak constitutional crisis

In 2009, the Pakatan Rakyat (PR) political group held a narrow majority in the Perak state assembly with 32 of the 59 seats.  Three members of the party decided to leave, and allied themselves with the rival BN coalition.  PR leader Mohammad Nizar Jamaluddin requested to dissolve the state assembly.  Sultan Azlan refused the request, citing royal discretion, and instead demanded Mohammad Nizar and the rest of the leadership resign their posts to make way for BN leaders.

The decision was challenged and the Kuala Lumpur High Court ruled that the Sultan was not constitutionally permitted to dismiss the menteri besar. However, upon appeal, the decision was reversed by the Court of Appeal which rules that the Perak State Constitution gives absolute discretionary power for the Sultan to dissolve the State Legislative Assembly.  The Court also directed Nizar to resign. The decision was subsequently upheld unanimously by the five-man Bench of Federal Court in February 2010.

Recognitions
Sultan Azlan was the Pro-Chancellor of the Universiti Sains Malaysia from October 1971 to February 1981 and the Chancellor of the University of Malaya from February 1983 until his death.  He also served the Chairman of the Higher Education Advisory Council from 1974 to 1976.  The University of Malaya awarded him an honorary doctorate in June 1979 and the University Science of Malaysia awarded him one the following June.

Sultan Azlan was recognised by several foreign universities, including:
University of Nottingham, Honorary Doctor of Law, July 1986
Honourable Society of Lincoln's Inn, "Honorary Bencher", 1988
Universitas Gajah Mada, Jogjakarta, Indonesia, Honorary Doctor of Law, 28 September 1990
Universiti Brunei Darussalam, Honorary Doctor of Law, 30 October 1990
Chulalongkorn University, Bangkok, Thailand, Honorary Doctor of Law, 19 December 1990.
Royal College of Physicians of Ireland, Royal College of Surgeons in Ireland, Royal College of Surgeons of Edinburgh, Honorary Fellow, 2 October 1991
Royal College of Surgeons of England, Honorary Fellow, 1999.

Sports
Sultan Azlan was an avid supporter of field hockey throughout his life.  Due to his significant contributions to the sport, he was known as the "Father of Malaysian Hockey." Azlan was President of the Malaysian Hockey Federation until 2005, and was the elected President of the Asian Hockey Federation from 1997 until his death. He was an Executive Board member of FIH (International Hockey Federation), serving as vice-president for two terms starting in 1992. Under Azlan Shah's leadership, Malaysia twice hosted the World Cup, in 1975 and 2002. In 1983, the sultan founded the Sultan Azlan Shah Cup, an annual hockey tournament played in Ipoh.

Sultan Azlan enjoyed golfing in his spare time.

Patron
Sultan Azlan was a patron of the following institutions:
The Academy of Medicine of Malaysia
The British Graduates Association of Malaysia
The Iskandar Polo Club
The Kuala Kangsar Golf Club
The Lions Clubs
The Malaysian Law Society in Great Britain and Éire
The Malaysian Nature Society
The Perak Veteran Hockey Association.
The Rotary Clubs
The Royal Ipoh Club and The Royal Perak Golf Club
St. John Ambulance of Malaysia, State of Perak Darul Ridzuan

Royal family
Sultan Azlan Shah married Bainun binti Mohd Ali on 9 December 1955. She is styled as Her Royal Highness The Raja Permaisuri (Queen Consort) of Perak, Tuanku Bainun Binti Mohd. Ali, D.K., D.M.N. The couple had five children, two princes and three princesses. The eldest is Raja Nazrin Shah, who is now the current Sultan of Perak. The others are Raja Azureen, Raja Ashman Shah, Raja Eleena and Raja Yong Sofia. Raja Ashman Shah died on 30 March 2012 of asthma attack.

Death
Sultan Azlan Shah died on 28 May 2014 at 1:30 pm at the National Heart Institute, Kuala Lumpur at aged 86. He was posthumously titled as Marhum Al-Maghfur-Lah. He was laid to rest next to grave of the previous ruler, Sultan Idris Shah at the Al-Ghufran Royal Mausoleum at Ubudiah Mosque, Kuala Kangsar, Perak after Asar prayers on 29 May, and the proclamation of a new Sultan was announced on 29 May. Upon his death, a public holiday was announced in the state of Perak for 29 May so that the population could pay their last respects to him at Kuala Kangsar. Menteri Besar of Perak Datuk Seri Zambry Abdul Kadir announced that the Malaysian flag would fly at half-mast for 7 days, and the Perak flag for 100 days. In addition, "all entertainment and celebrations" were cancelled to show respect for the Sultan. He is survived by his wife Tuanku Bainun, and his four children; Raja Nazrin Shah, Raja Dato' Seri Azureen, Raja Dato' Seri Eleena and Raja Dato' Seri Yong Sofia. Their second son, Raja Dato' Seri Ashman Shah predeceased him in 2012 due to asthma attack.

Issue

Literature
 (Special issue of the Supreme Court Journal to commemorate the installation of His Majesty Sultan Azlan Shah as the Yang di-Pertuan Agong IX Malaysia)

Honours

Perak honours
  Recipient of the Royal Family Order of Perak (DK, since 3 February 1984)
  Founding Grand Master of the Perak Family Order of Sultan Azlan Shah (2000)
  Founding Grand Master of the Azlanii Royal Family Order (2010)
  Grand Knight (or Dato' Seri, SPCM) and Grand Master (since 1984) of the Order of the Cura Si Manja Kini (Perak Sword of State, SPCM)
  Knight Grand Commander and Grand Master (since 1984) of the Order of Taming Sari (Perak State Kris, SPTS)
  Knight Grand Commander (or Dato' Seri) and Grand Master (since 1984) of the Order of the Perak State Crown (SPMP)

Malaysian honours
  Recipient of the Malaysian Commemorative Medal (Silver) (P.P.M.) (1965)
  Commander of the Order of Loyalty to the Crown of Malaysia (P.S.M.) – Tan Sri (7 June 1972)
  Commander of the Order of the Defender of the Realm (P.M.N.) – Tan Sri (1979)
 Grand Commander of the Order of Loyalty to the Crown of Malaysia (S.S.M.) – Tun (1983)
  Recipient of the Order of the Crown of the Realm (D.M.N.) (1987)
  Recipient of the Order of the Royal House of Malaysia (D.K.M.) (1989)
  Grand Master (1989–1994) of the Order of Merit of Malaysia
  Grand Master (1989–1994) of the Order of the Royal Household of Malaysia

State honours
  : 
  First Class of the Royal Family Order of Johor (DK I)
  : 
  Member of the Royal Family Order of Kedah (DK) (1986)
  : 
  Recipient of the Royal Family Order or Star of Yunus (DK)
  : 
  Member of the Royal Family Order of Negeri Sembilan (DKNS) (1989)
  : 
  Grand Knight of the Order of the Crown of Pahang (SIMP) – formerly Dato', now Dato' Indera
  Member 1st class of the Family Order of the Crown of Indra of Pahang (DK I) (1996)
  : 
  Recipient of the Perlis Family Order of the Gallant Prince Syed Putra Jamalullail (DK)
  : 
  First Class of the Royal Family Order of Selangor (DK I) (8 November 1985)
  : 
  Member first class of the Family Order of Terengganu (DK I) (6 July 1984)

Foreign honours
  :
 Grand Star of the Decoration of Honour for Services to the Republic of Austria (08/04/1992)
  : Royal Family Order of the Crown of Brunei (DKMB)
  :
 Grand Cross with Collar of the Order of the Merit of Chile (1992)
  :
Grand Cross Special Class of the Order of Merit of the Federal Republic of Germany (07/09/1992)
  :
Star of the Republic of Indonesia, 1st Class (09/1990)
  :
Collar of the Order of the Chrysanthemum (30 September 1991)
  : Collar of the Order of al-Hussein bin Ali
  :
Collar of the Civil Order of Oman, 1st Class (04/12/1991)
  :
Collar of Badr Chain (7.12.1991)
  :
Grand Order of Mugunghwa (or Supreme Order of Hibiscus)
  :
Collar of the Order of Honor of the Sudan (6 June 1991)
  :
 Honorary Knight Grand Cross of the Order of the Bath (GCB) (14 October 1989)
 Knight of The Order of St John (KStJ, 20 March 1990)
  :
Collar of the Order of the Rajamitrabhorn (09/1990)

Legacy
At the 1982 Perak Domestic Tourism Exposition, the orchid that won the best plant award was named after Azlan Shah, "Doritinopsis Sultan Azlan Shah".  The insect genus Azlania was named in honour of him by The Malaysia Nature Society.

Several building projects and institutions were named after the Sultan, including:

Educational institutions
SMK Sultan Azlan Shah, a secondary school in Lenggong, Perak
SMK Agama Sultan Azlan Shah, a secondary school in Seri Iskandar, Perak
Sekolah Menengah Sains Raja Tun Azlan Shah, a secondary school in Taiping, Perak
Kolej Sains Kesihatan Bersekutu Sultan Azlan Shah, Ulu Kinta, Perak
Kampus Sultan Azlan Shah, Universiti Pendidikan Sultan Idris (UPSI), Proton City, Tanjung Malim, Perak
Politeknik Sultan Azlan Shah, Behrang, Perak
Universiti Sultan Azlan Shah, Kuala Kangsar, Perak
Maktab Rendah Sains MARA (MRSM) Sultan Azlan Shah, in Kuala Kangsar, Perak

Buildings
Sultan Azlan Shah Gallery, a royal gallery in Kuala Kangsar, Perak
Sultan Azlan Shah Airport, Ipoh, Perak
Sultan Azlan Shah Hockey Stadium, Ipoh, Perak 
Sultan Azlan Shah Building, a Chancellery of the Universiti Malaya, Kuala Lumpur
Sultan Azlan Shah Mosque, a mosque in Ipoh, Perak
Muhibbuddin Shah Mosque, a mosque in Ipoh, Perak
Sultan Azlan Shah Power Station, a power station in Manjung, Perak

Roads
 Jalan Sultan Azlan Shah, a major roads in Ipoh, George Town, Penang and Kuala Lumpur (formerly Jalan Ipoh).
 Sultan Azlan Shah Bridge a bridge at the North–South Expressway Northern Route

Others
Taman Rekreasi Sultan Azlan Shah (formerly Taman Polo), a recreational area in Ipoh
Sultan Azlan Shah Cup, an international hockey tournament

References

1928 births
2014 deaths
Monarchs of Malaysia
Azlan Shah
Chief justices of Malaysia
Marshals of the Royal Malaysian Air Force
20th-century Malaysian judges
Azlan Shah
Federated Malay States people
People from British Malaya
Malaysian people of Malay descent
Malaysian Muslims
Alumni of the University of Nottingham

Recipients of the Darjah Kerabat Diraja Malaysia
Commanders of the Order of Loyalty to the Crown of Malaysia
Commanders of the Order of the Defender of the Realm
Grand Commanders of the Order of Loyalty to the Crown of Malaysia
First Classes of Royal Family Order of Selangor
First Classes of the Royal Family Order of Johor
Members of the Royal Family Order of Kedah
First Classes of the Family Order of Terengganu

Honorary Knights Grand Cross of the Order of the Bath
Knights of the Order of St John
Recipients of the Grand Star of the Decoration for Services to the Republic of Austria
Grand Crosses Special Class of the Order of Merit of the Federal Republic of Germany
20th-century Malaysian politicians
21st-century Malaysian politicians
Recipients of the Order of the Crown of the Realm
First Classes of the Family Order of the Crown of Indra of Pahang
Recipients of the Order of Merit of Malaysia
Recipients of orders, decorations, and medals of Sudan